Czech Peace is a 2010 Czech documentary film directed by Vít Klusák and Filip Remunda. The film won the White Goose award at the DMZ International Documentary Film Festival in 2010. The film followed a 2004 documentary from the same pair of directors, Czech Dream (Český sen). Following the release of Czech Peace, the directors announced plans to make a third documentary film to complete a trilogy.

References

External links 
 CSFD.cz - Český mír
 

2010 documentary films
2010 films
Czech documentary films
Czech Film Critics' Awards winners
Czech Lion Awards winners (films)
2010s Czech-language films